The 1970 Major League Baseball season: The Seattle Pilots relocated to Milwaukee and became the Brewers, thus returning Major League Baseball to Wisconsin for the first time since the relocation of the Milwaukee Braves to Atlanta following the 1965 season.  Major League Baseball returned to Seattle in 1977, when the Mariners began play.

Standings

American League

National League

Postseason

Bracket

Awards and honors
Baseball Hall of Fame
Lou Boudreau
Earle Combs
Ford Frick
Jesse Haines
Most Valuable Player
Boog Powell, Baltimore Orioles (AL)
Johnny Bench, Cincinnati Reds (NL)
Cy Young Award
Jim Perry, Minnesota Twins (AL)
Bob Gibson, St. Louis Cardinals (NL)
Rookie of the Year
Thurman Munson, New York Yankees (AL)
Carl Morton, Montreal Expos (NL)
Gold Glove Award
Jim Spencer (1B) (AL) 
Davey Johnson (2B) (AL) 
Brooks Robinson (3B) (AL) 
Luis Aparicio (SS) (AL) 
Paul Blair (OF) (AL) 
Mickey Stanley (OF) (AL) 
Ken Berry (OF) (AL)
Ray Fosse (C) (AL) 
Jim Kaat (P) (AL)

MLB statistical leaders

Home Field Attendance

Events
January 16 – Curt Flood, Gold Glove outfielder of the St. Louis Cardinals, files a civil lawsuit challenging Major League Baseball's reserve clause, a suit that will have historic implications. Flood refused to report to the Philadelphia Phillies after he was traded by the Cardinals three months ago, contending the baseball rule violates federal antitrust laws.
January 17 – The Sporting News names Willie Mays as Player of the Decade for the 1960s.
January 20 – Lou Boudreau is elected to the Hall of Fame by the Baseball Writers' Association of America on 232 of 300 ballots. Ralph Kiner finishes second with 167, 58 votes short.
February 1 – The Hall of Fame Special Committee on Veterans selects former commissioner Ford Frick and former players Earle Combs and Jesse Haines for enshrinement.
February 19 – Commissioner Bowie Kuhn announces the suspension of Detroit Tigers pitcher Denny McLain, effective April 1, for McLain's alleged involvement in a bookmaking operation. The suspension will last three months; it was indefinite for a while before its length was set.
April - National League umpires began wearing blue coats and short sleeved light blue shirts with the league's logo on the left pocket and a number (assigned alphabetically) on the right sleeve. 
April 1 – The Milwaukee Brewers organization, headed by Bud Selig, purchases the Seattle Pilots franchise for $10,800,000. Although negotiations were conducted over a period of months, it was not until March 31 when a federal bankruptcy referee declared the Pilots bankrupt. Brewers tickets go on sale the next day. Team equipment is shipped to Milwaukee County Stadium, where the Pilots insignia is ripped off of the uniforms; the move came so abruptly and there was no time for new uniforms as a result.
April 7 – Major League Baseball returns to Wisconsin after a four-year absence as the Brewers play their first game in Milwaukee, losing to the California Angels 12–0 before a crowd of 37,237.
April 7 – Pitcher Dave McNally strikes out 13 in nine innings as the Baltimore Orioles rip the Indians, 8–2, on Opening Day at Cleveland Stadium. Paul Blair leads the offensive attack, driving in a pair of runs and scoring three times. McNally holds the Indians to two runs on four hits and three walks to get the win. Rookie Roy Foster belts a two-run home run to account for Cleveland's only runs.
April 11 – At Comiskey Park, Danny Walton hits the first two home runs in Milwaukee Brewers history, both two-run shots coming against White Sox starter Billy Wynne. The Brewers win for the first time, 8–4.
April 22 – The New York Mets' Tom Seaver strikes out 19 San Diego Padres, including the last 10 in succession, in a 2–1 Mets win. Mike Corkins takes the loss. In this century, no one had ever struck out 10 in a row, a major league record. Counting the 10 whiffs, the Pads have struck out 29 times in two games, a National League record that will be topped in 1998 when the Houston Astros miss 31 times in two days. Jerry Grote adds one foul fly catch to his 19 putouts via strikeouts.
May 10 – Hoyt Wilhelm makes his 1,000th pitching appearance, the first pitcher in history to do so.
May 12 – At Chicago's Wrigley Field, Ernie Banks becomes the eighth member of the 500 home run club, connecting off Atlanta Braves pitcher Pat Jarvis during a 4–3, 11-inning Chicago Cubs win over the Braves. It is also his 1,600th career RBI. Ex-Cub Frank Secory umpires this game; he was one of the umpires in the 1953 game in which Banks hit his first home run. Billy Williams' homer in the ninth ties the game and Ron Santo's RBI single in the 11th wins it. Atlanta's Rico Carty, meanwhile, has three singles and has hit in 30 consecutive games.
May 17 – In the second game of a doubleheader against the Cincinnati Reds, Hank Aaron of the Atlanta Braves gets his 3,000th career hit, and is the founding member of the 3000-500 Club.
June 12 – In the first game of a doubleheader at San Diego Stadium, Dock Ellis of the Pittsburgh Pirates no-hits the San Diego Padres 2–0. Years later, Ellis would claim that he was under the influence of LSD the entire game.
June 21 – The Detroit Tigers' César Gutiérrez gets seven hits in seven at bats in 12 innings against the Cleveland Indians, setting an American League mark and tying a major league record for most hits in one game.
June 24 – The Cincinnati Reds defeat the San Francisco Giants, 5–4, in the Reds' final game at Crosley Field.
June 26 – Frank Robinson of the Baltimore Orioles hits grand slams in consecutive innings, the fourth and fifth, in a 12–2 victory over the Washington Senators at Robert F. Kennedy Stadium. The same runners are on base both times: Dave McNally on third, Don Buford on second, and Paul Blair on first.
June 28 – The Pittsburgh Pirates defeat the Chicago Cubs in both games of a doubleheader, 3–2 and 4–1, in the last two games played at Forbes Field.
June 30 – Riverfront Stadium opens with the Cincinnati Reds losing to the Atlanta Braves, 8–2.
July 3 – Clyde Wright of the California Angels has a doubly memorial day. In the afternoon, the former star pitcher at Carson-Newman College is inducted into the NAIA Hall of Fame. Hours later, he no-hits the Oakland Athletics 4–0, the first no-hitter ever pitched at Anaheim Stadium.
July 14 – At Riverfront Stadium, the National League wins its eighth straight All-Star Game, a thrilling 12-inning, 5–4 victory. Pete Rose crashes into Cleveland Indians catcher Ray Fosse to score the controversial winning run on Jim Hickman's single. Fosse, who never had the ball, hurts his right shoulder and is taken to the hospital. The game is scoreless until the sixth inning, with the NL limited to three hits in the first eight innings. In the ninth, the NL tees off on Catfish Hunter, driving in three runs to tie. Dick Dietz hits a leadoff home run in the inning. Claude Osteen pitches the 10th for the win, and Carl Yastrzemski of the Boston Red Sox captures the MVP trophy for the American League.
July 16 – Pittsburgh's Three Rivers Stadium opens to the public, but the Cincinnati Reds spoil the party as they beat the Pittsburgh Pirates 4–3 before a crowd of 48,846. Pittsburgh's Richie Hebner records the first hit in the new stadium, and Cincinnati's Tony Pérez smacks the first home run.
July 18 – Willie Mays of the San Francisco Giants records his 3,000th career hit.
July 20 – Bill Singer of the Los Angeles Dodgers no-hits the Philadelphia Phillies 5–0 at Dodger Stadium. Singer's catcher, Jeff Torborg, had caught Sandy Koufax's perfect game in 1965, and will later catch the first of Nolan Ryan's seven no-hitters, in 1973.
July 26 – Johnny Bench of the Cincinnati Reds hits three straight homers off Steve Carlton of the St. Louis Cardinals. On the same day, Orlando Cepeda of the Atlanta Braves connects for three consecutive homers in an 8–3 victory over the Chicago Cubs.
August 11 – Philadelphia's Jim Bunning beats the Houston Astros 6–5 to become the first pitcher to win 100 games in both leagues since Cy Young.
September 3 – Billy Williams of the Chicago Cubs asks to be kept out of the lineup, snapping his National League record of 1,117 consecutive games played. His record is broken in 1983 by Steve Garvey.
September 21 – Vida Blue of the Oakland Athletics no-hits the Minnesota Twins 6–0 at Oakland–Alameda County Coliseum, the only baserunner coming on Harmon Killebrew's second-inning walk. The no-hitter caps a season that witnesses four no-hitters, all pitched in California-based Major League stadiums; Candlestick Park is the only one of the five not to have a no-hitter pitched in it.
October 1 – Vic Davalillo of the St. Louis Cardinals breaks the National League single-season pinch hitting record against the Pittsburgh Pirates and ties the Major League record with his 24th pinch hit of the year.
October 15 – For the third time in the 1970 World Series, the Baltimore Orioles overcome a 3–0 deficit to bury the Cincinnati Reds 9–3, and win the World Championship four games to one. Frank Robinson and Merv Rettenmund each homer and drive in two runs. Third baseman Brooks Robinson, the "human vacuum cleaner", easily wins the Series MVP award.

See also
1970 in baseball

References

External links

1970 Major League Baseball season schedule at Baseball Reference

 
Major League Baseball seasons